Wayne Grimmer (born 21 May 1960) is a Canadian former field hockey player who competed in the 1988 Summer Olympics.

References

External links
 

1960 births
Living people
Canadian male field hockey players
Olympic field hockey players of Canada
Field hockey players at the 1988 Summer Olympics
Pan American Games medalists in field hockey
Pan American Games gold medalists for Canada
Field hockey players at the 1987 Pan American Games
Medalists at the 1987 Pan American Games